The Wellesley Congregational Church and Cemetery is a historic religious facility at 2 Central Street in the center of Wellesley, Massachusetts.  The church is a brick Georgian Revival structure designed by Carrère and Hastings and built between 1918 and 1922.  It is the fourth structure built for a congregation established in 1798, when the area was part of Newton.  The church complex includes the main sanctuary and administrative offices and a chapel, all part of the original 1918 design, and a 1955 parish hall.

The property was listed the National Register of Historic Places in 2014.

See also

National Register of Historic Places listings in Norfolk County, Massachusetts

References

External links
Church Website

United Church of Christ churches in Massachusetts
Churches on the National Register of Historic Places in Massachusetts
Churches in Norfolk County, Massachusetts
Wellesley, Massachusetts
National Register of Historic Places in Norfolk County, Massachusetts